Jonathan "Bates" Battaglia (born December 13, 1975) is an American former professional ice hockey left winger who played in the National Hockey League (NHL) with the Carolina Hurricanes, Colorado Avalanche, Washington Capitals and the Toronto Maple Leafs. He finished his professional career in 2012 with Karlskrona HK of the Swedish HockeyAllsvenskan.

Playing career
Battaglia was drafted by the Mighty Ducks of Anaheim in the sixth round, 132nd overall, of the 1994 NHL Entry Draft. Growing up, Bates played hockey in Park Ridge, Illinois, under coach Tom Godwin. He played on the three-time NCAA National Championship-winning Lake Superior State University Lakers ice hockey team from 1994 to 1997.

On March 18, 1997, Battaglia was traded by the Mighty Ducks to the Hartford Whalers for Mark Janssens. He made his professional debut in the 1997–98 season with the Beast of New Haven of the American Hockey League (AHL) before making his NHL debut with the Carolina Hurricanes in their inaugural season in Raleigh, having relocated from Hartford, Connecticut. Battaglia established himself as a NHL regular with the Hurricanes, enjoying his most successful period as a third of the "BBC line" (consisting of Rod Brind'Amour, Battaglia and Erik Cole) during their run to the 2002 Stanley Cup Final.

On March 11, 2003, Battaglia was traded to the Colorado Avalanche in exchange for Radim Vrbata. His tenure with Colorado was short, as he was traded at the start of the 2003–04 season (along with Jonas Johansson) to the Washington Capitals in exchange for Steve Konowalchuk.

During the 2004–05 NHL lockout, on February 21, 2005, Battaglia joined his younger brother Anthony on the Mississippi Sea Wolves of the ECHL for the 2004–05 season.

On October 2, 2005, Battaglia was signed by the AHL's Toronto Marlies to a one-year contract. For the following season, on July 2, 2006, he signed as a free agent with the Marlies' NHL parent club, the Toronto Maple Leafs, to a one-year contract. On July 2, 2007, he re-signed as a free agent with the Maple Leafs to a two-year contract. On December 13, 2007, he was assigned to the Marlies on a conditioning stint, but was left in the minors for the duration of the season. He was again assigned to the Marlies at the start of the 2008–09 season and scored a respectable 51 points in 59 games for the Marlies.

A free agent in the 2009–10 season, on November 11, 2009, Battaglia signed with the AHL's Syracuse Crunch. After 29 games with the Crunch, he left the club after signing a contract for the rest of the season with Finnish team Jokerit of the SM-liiga as an injury replacement on January 28, 2010.

On December 8, 2010, Battaglia signed a 25-game professional try-out contract with the AHL's Rochester Americans. After contributing only 3 points in 20 games with the Americans, he was released and signed with Lausitzer Füchse of the German 2nd Bundesliga. Battaglia's brief stay with Füchse was limited to two games due to injury, and on March 16, 2011, he returned to North America and signed to again join his brother Anthony, this time with the Tulsa Oilers of the Central Hockey League.

On November 2011, Battaglia signed with Karlskrona HK of the Swedish Division 1. In the 2011–12 season, Battaglia scored 23 points in 25 games to help Karlskrona gain promotion to the HockeyAllsvenskan.  Battaglia finished third among import players in league scoring behind Andrew Fournier and Bill Keenan.

Personal life
Battaglia is the grandson of former Chicago Outfit mobster Sam Battaglia, although this family connection has been downplayed by Battaglia in interviews.
Bates and his brother Anthony competed in twenty-second season of The Amazing Race and won the season.

Career statistics

Regular season and playoffs

International

Awards and honors

References

External links

1975 births
Living people
American men's ice hockey left wingers
Anaheim Ducks draft picks
Beast of New Haven players
Carolina Hurricanes players
Colorado Avalanche players
Ice hockey people from Chicago
Jokerit players
Karlskrona HK players
Lake Superior State Lakers men's ice hockey players
Mississippi Sea Wolves players
Rochester Americans players
Sportspeople from Park Ridge, Illinois
Syracuse Crunch players
Toronto Maple Leafs players
Toronto Marlies players
Tulsa Oilers (1992–present) players
Washington Capitals players
Reality show winners
The Amazing Race (American TV series) contestants